Patrik Christian Isaksson (born 3 August 1972) is a Swedish singer and songwriter. He competed in Swedish Melodifestivalen 2006 with the song "Faller du så faller jag" and again in 2008, with the song "Under mitt tunna skinn". In 2012, he competed in the Danish Dansk Melodi Grand Prix 2012 with the song "Venter", a duet with Christian Brøns. As of July 2020, Isaksson has released six studio albums.

Discography

Albums

Singles

References

External links 

 
 
 

1972 births
Living people
Singers from Stockholm
Swedish rock singers
Swedish male singer-songwriters
Swedish singer-songwriters
Swedish-language singers
21st-century Swedish singers
21st-century Swedish male singers
Melodifestivalen contestants of 2016
Melodifestivalen contestants of 2008